The World Choir Games (formerly named the Choir Olympics) is the largest global choral festival and competition. Organised by the Interkultur Foundation for amateur choirs from all over the world, regardless of their country of origin, race, genre of music or artistic ambitions, its motto is "Singing together brings nations together".

The Games originated from the idea to bring people together through singing in peaceful competition, showing that unity of nations through the arts can be effectively and illustratively demonstrated and challenged. The focus of the Games is on participation above winning, and it aims to inspire people to "experience the strength of interaction, challenging personality and community equally by singing together".

The most recent host of the Games was Antwerp and Ghent, Belgium from 30 October–7 November 2021. The next host is Gangneung, South Korea, from 3 to 13 July 2023 (postponed one year from the original 4 to 14 July 2022). The 2024 host city of Auckland, New Zealand, has also been announced.

General

The Games are hosted biennially (every even year) in a pre-selected city across the globe, where choirs compete in selected categories. In 2012, for instance, there were 23 categories, and in 2016 there were 29 categories, among them "Senior Choirs" and "University Choirs". The Games consist of competitions in two classes (Champions and Open), festival concerts, artistic workshops, and various ceremonies. During the competition, choirs compete for gold, silver, bronze, or "Successful Participation" awards. Medals are awarded in the Champions Competition, and diplomas are awarded in the Open Competition. The choir that attains the highest point and a gold medal in a category during the Champions Competition is awarded the title of "Champion of the World Choir Games" for that category.

As part of the festival aspect of the Games choirs may also choose to participate in artistic workshops featuring renowned choral instructors, as well as friendship concerts and free public concerts where choirs share their music with choristers and audiences from different parts of the world. Ceremonies that form part of the Games include opening and closing ceremonies where up to 20,000 choristers join in a single venue, as well as the award ceremonies where the outcomes of the Open Competition and Champions Competition are announced. During the proceedings of the Games, the host for the next edition of the Games is usually also announced.

Competitions

See also

Stellenbosch University Choir, one of the leading participants at the World Choir Games; also rated as the best amateur choir in the world by Interkultur since September 2012.

References

External links

 Official website of the Interkultur Foundation
 Official website of the Tshwane2018 World Choir Games

Biennial events
Choral festivals
Recurring events established in 2000
Singing competitions